al-Bir Tahtani is a village in northern Aleppo Governorate, northern Syria.

With 179 inhabitants, as per the 2004 census, al-Bir Tahtani administratively belongs to Nahiya Jarabulus within Jarabulus District. Nearby localities include al-Haluwaniyah  to the northeast, and al-Bir Fawqani  to the southwest.

References

Villages in Aleppo Governorate